is a city located in Saitama Prefecture, Japan. , the city had an estimated population of 112,792 in 48,213 households and a population density of 850 persons per km². The city is noted for is known throughout Japan for the creation of koinobori (carp kites), baseballs, kendo equipment, and Kazo-udon noodles.

Geography
Kazo is located in far northeastern Saitama Prefecture, bordered by Gunma Prefecture, Tochigi Prefecture and Ibaraki Prefectures along the alluvial plain of the Watarase River and Tone River. The terrain is generally low and flat.

Surrounding municipalities
Saitama Prefecture
 Gyōda
 Kōnosu
 Kuki
 Hanyū
Gunma Prefecture
 Itakura
Tochigi Prefecture
 Tochigi
Ibaraki Prefecture
Koga

Climate
Kazo has a humid subtropical climate (Köppen Cfa) characterized by warm summers and cool winters with light to no snowfall.  The average annual temperature in Kazo is 14.6 °C. The average annual rainfall is 1318 mm with September as the wettest month. The temperatures are highest on average in August, at around 26.7 °C, and lowest in January, at around 3.5 °C.

Demographics
Per Japanese census data, the population of Kazo peaked around the year 2000 and has declined slightly in the decades since.

History
The area of modern Kazo has been settled since prehistoric times and many burial mounds from the Kofun period dot the landscape. The name "Kazo" appears in Nara period documents describing within Musashi Province. During the Edo period, the Buddhist temple of Sogan-ji was a popular pilgrimage destination from Edo.

The town of Kazo was created within Kitasaitama District, Saitama with the establishment of the modern municipalities system on April 1, 1889.  On May 3, 1954, Kazo annexed the neighboring town of Fudooka, and the villages of Mitsumata, Raiha, Ōkuwa, Mizufuka, Hirakikawa and Shidai and was elevated to city status.

On March 23, 2010, Kazo absorbed the towns of Kisai, Kitakawabe and Ōtone (all from Kitasaitama District) which was dissolved as a result of this merger.

Government
Kazo has a mayor-council form of government with a directly elected mayor and a unicameral city council of 28 members. Kazo contributes three members to the Saitama Prefectural Assembly. In terms of national politics, the city is part of Saitama 12th district of the lower house of the Diet of Japan.

Economy
The computer graphics tablet manufacturer, Wacom is headquartered in Kazo.

Education
Heisei International University
Kazo has 22 public elementary schools and eight public middle schools operated by the city government, and one public high school operated by the Saitama Prefectural Board of Education. In addition, there are one private middle school and two private high schools. The prefecture also operates one special education school for the handicapped.

Transportation

Railway
 Tobu Railway - Isesaki Line
 -  
 Tobu Railway - Nikkō Line
 -

Highway
  – Kazo Interchange

Noted people from Kazo
Yutaka Taniyama, mathematician

References

External links

Official Website 

Cities in Saitama Prefecture
Kazo, Saitama